Catoptria myella is a species of moth in the family Crambidae. It is found in large parts of Europe, except Ireland, Great Britain, the Benelux, Fennoscandia, Denmark, the Baltic region, the Czech Republic, Slovakia and the Iberian Peninsula.

The wingspan is 21–28 mm. Adults have been recorded from May to September.

Subspecies
Catoptria myella myella (Alps, Karpathians)
Catoptria myella mellinella (de Lattin, 1951) (southern Alps)

References

Moths described in 1796
Crambini
Moths of Europe